Hemigrammus ocellifer is a South American freshwater fish, also described by the synonyms Hemibrycon ocellifer and Tetragonopterus ocellifer. Common names include beacon fish, beacon tetra, head-and-tail light tetra and head-and-taillight tetra.  It is found in the rivers of Guyana, Suriname, French Guiana, and the Amazon Basin of Brazil and Peru.

Most specimens offered for sale in the aquatics trade are tank-raised.

Care
Captive-raised specimens will acclimatise to a range of water conditions: pH should be 6-8; dH up to 18°; and temperature .

A suitable species for planted community aquariums, beacon tetras should be kept in shoals of six or more and provided with floating plants to diffuse any bright lighting. Hiding places and open swimming areas should be available and consideration is given to the colors of this fish showing best when they are housed in tanks with a dark substrate and background.

Feeding
Beacon tetras will accept flake, micropellets, and frozen foods such as mosquito larvae, brine shrimp and daphnia.

Breeding
An egg-laying species, Hemigrammus ocellifer is relatively easy to breed. A separate small planted breeding aquarium should be set up with soft, slightly acidic water, and the temperature set at the high end of their range. When morning sunlight hits the tank, spawning should commence, and between 200 and 1000 eggs can be laid. The parents should be removed immediately after spawning ceases, and the eggs will hatch in 24 hours.

References

External links 
Fishbase
Head and Tail Light Tetra Fact Sheet 
Badmans Tropical Fish
Mongabay

Tetras
Taxa named by Franz Steindachner
Fish described in 1882